Naehae of Silla (died 230, r. 196–230) was the tenth king of Silla, one of the Three Kingdoms of Korea.  He is commonly called Naehae Isageum, isageum being the royal title in early Silla. As a descendant of Silla's 4th king Talhae, his surname was Seok.

Family 

 Grandfather: Beolhyu of Silla (died 196, r. 184–196) 
 Grandmther: Unknown Queen
 Father: Seok Imae (석이매)
 Mother: Queen Naerye of the Park clan (내례부인 박씨)
 Spouse: 
Queen Seok, of the Seok Clan (석부인 석씨), daughter of Seok Goljeong (석골정)
Daughter: Queen Aihye, of the Seok Clan (아이혜부인) – married Jobun of Silla
Son:  Seok Uru (석우로) 
Daughter-in-law: Queen Myeongwon, of the Seok clan (명원부인 석씨), daughter of Jobun of Silla 
Grandson: Heulhae of Silla, the 16th King of Silla 
Son: Seok Yieum (석이음) 
Daughter-in-law: Queen Miso, of the Park clan (미소부인 박씨) 
Granddaughter: Queen Park, of the Park clan  (미소부인 박씨)

Background
He was the grandson of the previous ruler, Beolhyu Isageum. Beolhyu's crown prince Goljeong and second son Imae died early, and Goljeong's son Jobun was too young.  Naehae was the son of Seok Imae and Lady Naerye who is Jima Isageum's daughter. 

Nae married a cousin within the Seok clan. His queen's younger brother Jobun became the next king.

Reign
During his reign, the Samguk Sagi reports cordial relations with the neighboring Gaya Confederacy, and repeated clashes with the rival kingdom Baekje.

Baekje invaded in 199 and 214; Silla responded by conquering Baekje's Sahyeon castle. Naehae personally led the successful defense to Baekje's next attack in 218. Mohe invaded and defeat in 203, In 212, Gaya sent the prince to Silla as a hostage.

Win in the Eight Port Kingdoms War(浦上八國 亂)(209~212). In this era, Seok Uro, son of Naehae of Silla and son-in-law of Jobun of Silla, was first active as a general.

See also
Three Kingdoms of Korea
Rulers of Korea
History of Korea

References

External links
The Academy of Korean Studies
Doosan Encyclopedia

Silla rulers
230 deaths
3rd-century monarchs in Asia
2nd-century monarchs in Asia
Year of birth unknown
3rd-century Korean people
2nd-century Korean people